Malaysia competed in the 1994 Asian Games in Hiroshima, Japan from 2 to 16 October 1994. Malaysia ended the games at 19 overall medals.

Medal summary

Medals by sport

Medallists

Athletics

Men
Track event

Badminton

Bowling

Men

Women

Cycling

Road

Track
Points race

Field hockey

Men's tournament
Group A

Fifth to eighth place classification

Fifth and sixth place match

Ranked 5th in final standings

Football

Men's tournament
Group B

Ranked 12th in final standings

Golf

Gymnastics

Rhythmic
Women

Karate

Men
Kumite

Women
Kumite

Sailing

Open

Sepaktakraw

Taekwondo

Men

Tennis

Men's team
Round of 16

Quarterfinal

Semifinal

Ranked 3rd in final standings

Wushu

Men

Women

References

Nations at the 1994 Asian Games
1994
Asian Games